This is a list of film production and distribution companies. A production company may specialize in producing their in-house films or own subsidiary development companies. Major production companies often distribute films from independent production companies. This list includes both active and no longer active (defunct) companies. Active production companies are either run by themselves or as a subsidiary.

Film studios also create television programs for broadcast syndication.

Notable production companies

See also
 Film producer
 List of animation studios
 List of documentary films
 List of film and television directors
 List of television production companies
 Lists of actors
 Lists of films
 Major film studio

References

Production Companies
Lists of companies by industry